Brandon Hall (born January 15, 1976) is an American football coach. He is currently the Assistant Coach / Safeties for the University of Oklahoma Sooners football. He was most recently the interim head coach and defensive coordinator at Troy University. He has previous coordinator experience at Broken Arrow High School in Oklahoma, Central Oklahoma, and Jacksonville State in Alabama.

Coaching career

Oklahoma
Hall began his coaching career as an undergraduate student assistant coach for the Oklahoma Sooners football team for the 1998 season. He was a member of the Oklahoma staff until 2005 in different roles. Hall was a student assistant from 1998–2000 under Brent Venables and then-head coach Bob Stoops, a graduate assistant in the 2001–2002 season, and a defensive quality control coach from 2003 to 2005. During the 2000 football season, Hall and the Sooners won the 2001 Orange Bowl, thus claiming the 2000 NCAA National Championship.

Northern Iowa
In 2006, Hall was the linebackers coach at Northern Iowa.

Broken Arrow High School
Hall was the defensive coordinator and coached the linebackers at Broken Arrow High School in Broken Arrow, Oklahoma for the 2007 season.

Central Oklahoma
Hall spent the 2008 through 2010 seasons as the co-defensive coordinator, linebackers coach, and recruiting coordinator at NCAA Division II Central Oklahoma.

Oklahoma (second stint)
In 2011, Hall returned to Oklahoma for a season as a defensive assistant.

Arkansas State
In 2012, Hall joined Gus Malzahn's staff at Arkansas State as the safeties coach. He helped lead the Red Wolves to their second consecutive Sun Belt Conference championship.

Auburn
Hall followed Malzahn to Auburn as a defensive assistant. That year, the Tigers advanced to the BCS National Championship Game.

Jacksonville State
Hall was the co-defensive coordinator and safeties coach at Jacksonville State from 2014 to 2017. During his tenure, he helped the Gamecocks to a perfect 31–0 record in Ohio Valley Conference (OVC) play, and a 43–8 record overall. Jacksonville State's defenses were ranked top 20 nationally in all four of Hall's seasons.

Troy
Hall joined the Troy Trojans football staff for the 2018 season as the special teams coordinator and outside linebackers coach. His special teams ranked fourth nationally in net punting, and ninth nationally in kick return. For the 2019 season, new head coach Chip Lindsey promoted Hall to defensive coordinator, and he subsequently took on coaching the safeties. In 2021 he was the team’s interim head coach for a game.

Oklahoma (third stint)
He was named the team’s Assistant Coach / Safeties coach, announced by Head Coach Brent Venables on Dec 17, 2021.

Personal life
Hall was raised in Newcastle, Oklahoma. He earned an associate degree from Oklahoma City Community College and bachelor's and master's degrees from the University of Oklahoma. He is married to the former Crystal Latham. Together they have three children, daughters; Maddie and Charlee , and son; Will.

Head coaching record

References

Living people
Auburn Tigers football coaches
Arkansas State Red Wolves football coaches
Central Oklahoma Bronchos football coaches
Jacksonville State Gamecocks football coaches
Northern Iowa Panthers football coaches
Oklahoma Sooners football coaches
Troy Trojans football coaches
High school football coaches in Oklahoma
University of Oklahoma alumni
People from McClain County, Oklahoma
1976 births